Jamil Hopoate (born 8 November 1994) is an Australian former professional rugby league footballer and convicted criminal who last played as a  and  for the Brisbane Broncos in the National Rugby League (NRL).

Background
He was born and raised in Manly, New South Wales but of Tongan and Samoan descent. He is the son of former Manly-Warringah Sea Eagles player John Hopoate and younger brother of rugby league player William Hopoate.

Playing career
Hopoate made his debut in round 1 of the 2020 NRL season for the Brisbane Broncos vs North Queensland Cowboys starting from the bench.

Hopoate played 12 games for Brisbane in the 2020 NRL season as they finished last on the table for the first time in the club's history.

Hopoate was released by Brisbane Broncos at the end of the 2020 season.

Convictions
In 2012, Hopoate was sacked by Parramatta due to a string of off-field incidents which included a mid-range drink driving conviction.

In 2014, Hopoate was jailed for one year and given a two-year good behaviour bond after a violent assault on two men at a Sydney pub.  Hopoate was later sacked by his club Manly-Warringah over the incident.

In December 2020, Hopoate was charged with two counts of domestic violence-related assault, one count of assault, two counts of intimidation with intent to cause fear of physical or mental harm, and one count each of driving while his licence was suspended and mid-range drink-driving. In October 2021 he was sentenced to a 12-month intensive corrections order under which he must abstain from alcohol and undertake 250 hours of community service. He also has to pay $2100 in fines for the driving offences.

In May 2021, Hopoate was charged with large-scale commercial drug supply.  He pleaded guilty in May 2022.  He and Leanne Mofoa, who was charged as an accessory after the fact, were sentenced on 20 October. Hopoate was given maximum jail time of three years and nine months, and will be eligible for parole on 25 July 2024. Mofoa was sentenced to an 18-month intensive corrections order in the community.

References

External links
Brisbane Broncos profile

1994 births
Living people
Australian drug traffickers
Australian people convicted of assault
Australian rugby league players
Australian sportspeople of Tongan descent
Brisbane Broncos players
Jamil
Redcliffe Dolphins players
Rugby league players from Sydney
Rugby league second-rows
Australian prisoners and detainees